Matthew Anthony Stevens (born July 30, 1964) is a retired professional American football quarterback who played one season in the National Football League. He played for the Kansas City Chiefs following the 1987 NFL strike. He played in three games for the Chiefs, starting two of them. He played high school football at Fountain Valley High School and collegiate football at UCLA.

Career 
In the 1986 UCLA vs. USC game, Karl Dorrell was on the receiving end of a play from Stevens that the Los Angeles Times dubbed "Hail Mary, and in your face.." On the last play of the first half, UCLA quarterback Stevens threw a Hail Mary pass, which was tipped into the hands of the flanker—Dorrell—to put the Bruins up 31–0 at the half. The Bruins went on to win 45–25.

Stevens was the quarterback for UCLA in the 1986 Rose Bowl in which the Bruins defeated the Iowa Hawkeyes 45-28.  Stevens was 16-26 for 169 yards and one touchdown.

Stevens is currently the football color analyst on UCLA's flagship radio station. In 2001, Stevens was voted "Color Analyst of the Year" by the Southern California Broadcasters Association.

References

1964 births
Living people
People from Sulphur, Louisiana
Players of American football from Louisiana
American football quarterbacks
UCLA Bruins football players
Kansas City Chiefs players
Los Angeles Cobras players
National Football League replacement players